Moncé-en-Belin is a commune in the Sarthe department in the region of Pays de la Loire in north-western France, with a municipal population of 3,703 in January 2019, with a further 62 counted separately.

The commune is historically in the Haut-Maine part of the province of Maine.

Toponymy 
The suffix Belin expresses the belonging of the commune to the territory of Belinois.

During the French Revolution, the town bore the name of Moncé-lès-Le Mans, in reference to the nearby city of Le Mans.

Geography 
Moncé-en-Belin is located 12 km south of Le Mans, 10 km north-west of Écommoy, and about 8 km from the 24 Hours of Le Mans circuit.

 Latitude: 47° 53' 38.616'' N
 Longitude: 0° 12' 16.992'' E
 Altitude: 58 m

Local culture and heritage 
The area around the town has several sites of notable historical value, including the following:

 Church of Saint-Étienne from the 11th century, containing a retable set, a mural of the Virgin Mary, a painting, and two statues, which have been given the designation of Monument historique
 Chapel of Notre-Dame-des-Bois from 1828
 War memorial
 Monument to the eight airmen (six Canadians, one English, and one Australian) who died on 23 May 1944, during World War II
 Castle mound of Vaux
 Roman camp
 Château de la Gourdinière
 Château de la Beaussonière
 Hattonnieres Castle

See also
Communes of the Sarthe department

References

Communes of Sarthe